25 is a greatest hits album by Norwegian band A-ha. It was released in Norway on 19 July 2010, in Germany and central Europe on 6 August, and in the United Kingdom and other parts of Europe on 4 October.
25 includes all 33 of the band's singles (excluding the promo singles "I Wish I Cared", "Birthright", "Waiting for Her", "Lie Down in Darkness", "Maybe, Maybe" and "Love Is Reason", as well as the original 1988 single "The Blood That Moves the Body" and the 2003 live version of "The Sun Always Shines on T.V."), along with five album tracks and the B-side "Cold as Stone" (remix).

The album includes the single "Butterfly, Butterfly (The Last Hurrah)" which had the world premiere on 14 June 2010 and was made available as a digital download on 9 July. The Japanese version features a different track list, with three tracks chosen by the Japanese public. This compilation is far more comprehensive than either of the two previous compilations (Headlines and Deadlines – The Hits of A-ha and The Definitive Singles Collection 1984–2004).

Track listings

Compilation
Disc One
 "Take On Me" – 3:49 
 "The Blue Sky" – 2:36 
 "The Sun Always Shines on T.V." – 5:08 
 "Train of Thought" (7" remix) – 4:15 
 "Hunting High and Low" (7" remix) – 3:48 
 "I've Been Losing You" – 4:26 
 "Scoundrel Days" – 4:00 
 "The Swing of Things" – 4:15 
 "Cry Wolf" – 4:06 
 "Manhattan Skyline" (edit version) – 4:21 
 "The Living Daylights" – 4:12 
 "Stay on These Roads" – 4:46 
 "Touchy!" (UK DJ edit) – 3:38 
 "There's Never a Forever Thing" – 2:51 
 "You Are the One" (7" remix) – 3:50 
 "The Blood That Moves the Body" (Two-Time Gun Remix) – 4:08 
 "Crying in the Rain" – 4:21 
 "Early Morning" – 2:59 
 "Slender Frame" – 3:43 
 "I Call Your Name" (Special DJ edit) – 4:29 

Disc Two
 "Move to Memphis" (single version) – 4:17 
 "Dark is the Night for All" – 3:45 
 "Cold as Stone" (remix) – 4:33 
 "Angel in the Snow" (edit) – 4:07 
 "Shapes That Go Together" – 4:14 
 "Summer Moved On" – 4:37 
 "Minor Earth Major Sky" (Niven's radio edit) – 4:02 
 "The Sun Never Shone That Day" (radio edit) – 3:31 
 "Velvet" – 4:20 
 "Forever Not Yours" – 4:06 
 "Lifelines" – 4:17 
 "Did Anyone Approach You?" – 4:11 
 "Celice" – 3:40 
 "Analogue (All I Want)" – 3:49 
 "Cosy Prisons" (radio mix) – 3:58 
 "Foot of the Mountain" – 3:57 
 "Nothing Is Keeping You Here" (single remix) – 3:05 
 "Shadowside" (single edit) – 3:31 
 "Butterfly, Butterfly (The Last Hurrah)" – 4:10 
 "Hunting High and Low" (slow version demo) – 3:45 (German Amazon.de bonus track)
 "Butterfly, Butterfly (The Last Hurrah)" (Steve Osborne Version) – 4:28 (iTunes Deluxe Edition bonus track)

DVD (25: The Videos)
 "Take On Me" (1985 version)
 "The Sun Always Shines On T.V."
 "I`ve Been Losing You" (original version)
 "Manhattan Skyline"
 "Stay On These Roads"
 "Crying In The Rain" (alternate cut)
 "Dark Is The Night For All" ("banned" version)
 "Move To Memphis"
 "Shapes That Go Together"
 "Angel In The Snow"
 "Summer Moved On"
 "Minor Earth, Major Sky"
 "Lifelines"
 "Did Anyone Approach You?"
 "Velvet" (European Cut, a.k.a. "Licking version")
 "Butterfly, Butterfly (The Last Hurrah)"

Bonus video
 "Take On Me" (1984 version)

Japanese track listing
The Japanese version features a shortened track list sequenced out of chronological order, however it does include seven tracks not included in the international version (indicated by a *):

CD1
 "Take On Me"
 "Hunting High and Low (7" remix)
 "Stay on These Roads"
 "Foot of the Mountain"
 "The Sun Always Shines on T.V."
 "I've Been Losing You"
 "Summer Moved On"
 "Crying in the Rain"
 "Analogue"
 "Manhattan Skyline" (edit version)
 "The Swing of Things"
 "Scoundrel Days"
 "Rolling Thunder" *
 "And You Tell Me" *
 "You Are the One" (7" remix)
 "The Blue Sky"
 "The Living Daylights"
 "Lifelines"
 "Living a Boy's Adventure Tale" *

CD2
 "Velvet"
 "Angel in the Snow" (edit)
 "Shadowside" (single edit)
 "Train of Thought" (7" remix)
 "Out of Blue Comes Green" *
 "Dark Is the Night for All"
 "Waiting for Her" *
 "Here I Stand and Face the Rain" *
 "The Blood That Moves the Body" (Two-Time Gun remix)
 "Minor Earth Major Sky" (Niven's radio edit)
 "Cry Wolf"
 "The Weight of the Wind" *
 "Slender Frame"
 "Move to Memphis" (single version)
 "Touchy!" (UK DJ edit)
 "I Call Your Name"
 "Shapes That Go Together"
 "Butterfly, Butterfly (The Last Hurrah)"

Charts

Weekly charts

Year-end charts

Certifications

References

2010 greatest hits albums
A-ha albums
Rhino Entertainment compilation albums
Warner Records compilation albums
Albums produced by Alan Tarney